Halls Bay is a natural bay located near the Baie Verte Peninsula of the island of Newfoundland, in the Canadian province of Newfoundland and Labrador.

Halls Bay has been the determining point for the northern route of the Newfoundland Railway and then the location of the Trans-Canada Highway and is commonly referred to as the Halls Bay Line. Communities located in Halls Bay are; Springdale, South Brook and Port Anson.

Notable people
Mattie Mitchell (1846-1921) - Mi’kmaq Chieftain, guide, prospector, and explorer.

Bays of Newfoundland and Labrador